Abazar (also Romanized as Abāz̄ar) is a village in Yurchi-ye Gharbi Rural District, Kuraim District, Nir County, Ardabil Province, Iran. At the 2011 census, its population was 101, in 39 families.

References 

Towns and villages in Nir County